Bagtygul Altybaýewa (1903 – 5 January 1972) was a Soviet politician.

She served as Minister of Light Industry of the Turkmen SSR.

References

1903 births
1972 deaths
20th-century Turkmenistan women politicians
20th-century Turkmenistan politicians
Soviet women in politics
Turkmenistan communists
Women government ministers of Turkmenistan